The Chennai Egmore–Velankanni Link Express is an Express train belonging to Southern Railway zone that runs between  and  in India. It is currently being operated with 16185/16186 train numbers on a daily basis.

Service

The 16185/Chennai Egmore–Velankanni Link Express has an average speed of 42 km/hr and covers 353 km in 8h 30m. The 16186/Velankanni–Chennai Egmore Link Express has an average speed of 42 km/hr and covers 353 km in 8h 30m.

Route and halts 

The important halts of the train are:

Coach composition

The train has standard ICF rakes with a max speed of 110 kmph. The train consists of 23 coaches:

 1 AC II Tier
 2 AC III Tier
 10 Sleeper coaches
 2 Slip coaches
 6 General Unreserved
 2 Seating cum Luggage Rake
 1 Brake van

Traction

Both trains are hauled by a Royapuram Loco Shed-based WAP-7 electric locomotive from [Chennai to Viluppuram. From Viluppuram, train is hauled by a Golden Rock Loco Shed-based WDM-3A diesel locomotive uptil Karaikal and vice versa.

Rake sharing

The train shares its rake with 16187/16188 Tea Garden Express and 56385/56386 Ernakulam–Kottayam Passenger. The train is detached from  Chennai Egmore–Karaikal Kamban Express at Nagappattinam and runs as Chennai Egmore–Velankanni Link Express.

Direction reversal

The train reverses its direction 2 times:

See also 

 Chennai Egmore railway station
 Karaikal railway station
 Tea Garden Express

Notes

References

External links 

 16185/Chennai Egmore–Velankanni Link Express India Rail Info
 16186/Velankanni–Chennai Egmore Link Express India Rail Info

Transport in Chennai
Express trains in India
Rail transport in Tamil Nadu
Rail transport in Puducherry
Railway services introduced in 2013